TeXstudio is a cross-platform open-source LaTeX editor. Its features include an interactive spelling checker, code folding, and syntax highlighting. It does not provide LaTeX itself – the user must choose a TeX distribution and install it first.

Originally called TexMakerX, TeXstudio was started as a fork of Texmaker that tried to extend it with additional features while keeping its look and feel.

Features 

TeXstudio's features include:
 Auto-completion (also of newly defined custom LaTeX commands)
 Scripting support
 Assistants for images, tables, formulas (assistants offer GUI for visual and user-friendly creation of structures with complex code)
 Drag and drop support for images
 Template system
 Syntax highlighting
 Spellchecker
 Integrated PDF viewer
 Live-updating inline preview for formulas and code segments
 SVN support
 Integration with the BibTeX and BibLaTeX bibliographies managers
 Export into HTML
 Document lexical analysis (e.g. word count, word frequency count, phrase count)

History of TeXstudio 

TeXstudio was forked from TeXMaker in 2008 as TeXMakerX.  Changes in the fork were mainly in the editing area with code folding, syntax highlight, text selection by column, and multiple text selections.  The project was initially named TeXmakerX, starting off as a small set of extensions to TeXmaker with a possibility that the additions could be merged back into the original project.

The first release of TexMakerX was released in February 2009 on SourceForge.  Collaborating on the SourceForge community web site reflected a preference different from the original TeXMaker development community, who maintain an independent hosting site.

In August 2010, concerns were raised about potential confusion between the newer TeXMakerX project on SourceForge, and the older TeXMaker project at xm1math.net.  In June 2011, the project was renamed as TeXstudio.

The TeXstudio community acknowledges that "TeXstudio originates from Texmaker", but "significant changes in features and the code base have made it to a fully independent program".

Version history

See also

 Comparison of TeX editors
 Texmaker

References

External links

TeXstudio website
OpenOffice.Org dictionaries
user manual
TeXstudio wiki
A user review

Free TeX editors
Linux TeX software
TeX editors
TeX editors that use Qt